Nevada's 19th Senate district is one of 21 districts in the Nevada Senate. It has been represented by Republican Pete Goicoechea since 2013. It is the most Republican-leaning district in the state.

Geography
District 19 covers a vast swath of rural Nevada, including all of Elko, Eureka, Lincoln, and White Pine Counties and parts of Clark and Nye Counties. Communities in the district include Carlin, Elko, Wells, West Wendover, Jackpot, Spring Creek, Eureka, Caliente, Alamo, Pioche, Ely, McGill, Amargosa Valley, Beatty, Pahrump, Round Mountain, Moapa, and Sandy Valley. The district is also home to Area 51.

The district overlaps with Nevada's 2nd, 3rd, and 4th congressional districts, and with the 33rd and 36th districts of the Nevada Assembly. It borders the states of California, Arizona, Utah, and Idaho.

At over 60,000 square miles, the 19th district is the largest district in the state, accounting for over half of the state's total land area, and is in fact the largest state legislative district in the continental United States.

Recent election results
Nevada Senators are elected to staggered four-year terms; since 2012 redistricting, the 19th district has held elections in presidential years.

2020

2016

2012

Federal and statewide results in District 19

History 
District 19 was created when the senatorial districts were redrawn in 2011 as a result of the 2010 Census. The new districts went into effect on January 1, 2012 for filing for office, and for nominating and electing senators. They became effective for all other purposes on November 7 of the same year – the day after Election Day, when the new terms began. The law defines District 19's borders using census tracts, block groups, and blocks.

Rural Senatorial District
Most of the district was previously in the Rural Senatorial District. After the 1991 redistricting the rural district encompassed Humboldt, Pershing and Elko Counties as well as parts of Lander and Eureka Counties. After the 2000 Census the district also encompassed all of Lander, Eureka, White Pine and Lincoln Counties as well as parts of Nye County.

References 

19
Clark County, Nevada
Elko County, Nevada
Eureka County, Nevada
Lincoln County, Nevada
Nye County, Nevada
White Pine County, Nevada